S.S.C. Napoli crashed out of Serie A following a disastrous season. It only clinched 14 points out of 34 matches, despite having the services of several experienced Serie A players. Napoli went through four coaches over the course of the season, and hardly took a point in the second half of the season. Given the disastrous form of the team, Claudio Bellucci's ten goals were impressive, while thought top scorer Igor Protti was one of the largest disappointments of the entire series. The lack of defensive skills cost Napoli many points, and more than two goals were conceded on average. This was despite Roberto Ayala's brilliance, which earned him a transfer to A.C. Milan.

Only eight years following Napoli's second title, the club seemed to be in terminal decline, with hard work being needed to return to the top domestic league. Given that the club had not been relegated since a bankruptcy in 1964, the relegation was a shock, by the extremely poor season.

Squad

Transfers

Winter

Competitions

Serie A

League table

Results by round

Matches

Statistics

Players statistics 

|-
! colspan=14 style=background:#dcdcdc; text-align:center| Players transferred out during the season

References

Sources
  RSSSF - Italy 1997/98

S.S.C. Napoli seasons
Napoli